Gobeom Sie Vitalis (born October 23, 1990) is a Liberian football defender. He previously played for Hapoel Nazareth Illit.

Honours 
 2010/2011: Liberian Golden Boot

References

External links 
 

1990 births
Living people
Liberian footballers
Liberia international footballers
Association football forwards
Expatriate footballers in Israel